Khalilabad (also Romanized as Khalīlābād) is a village in Pain Jovin Rural District, Helali District, Joghatai County, Razavi Khorasan Province, Iran. At the 2006 census, its population was 351 across 85 families.

References 

Populated places in Joghatai County